San Miguel is a census-designated place in Doña Ana County, New Mexico, United States. Its population was 1,153 as of the 2010 census. San Miguel has a post office with ZIP code 88058. The community is located at the junction of state routes 28 and 192.

Geography

Demographics

Education
The Gadsden Independent School District operates public schools, including North Valley Elementary School. The designated High School(s) for this area would either be Gadsden High School or Alta Vista Early College High School.

References

Census-designated places in New Mexico
Census-designated places in Doña Ana County, New Mexico